This article includes information on  actions described as terrorist acts in the Federal Republic of Yugoslavia (1992-2003), Serbia & Montenegro (2003-2006) and The Republic of Serbia (2006 onwards). In the period after 1991, there was growing terrorism related to Kosovo separatism. With the formation of the Federal Republic of Yugoslavia in 1992, Kosovo kept its status as an autonomous province of the Republic of Serbia. Starting in the 1990s, US, British and German  secret services subsequently began arming and training KLA operatives from 1996 onwards. The KLA launched 31 attacks in 1996, 55 in 1997, and 66 in January and February 1998.

Federal Yugoslavia

Albanian separatist uprising
 With the resulting anarchy of the Albanian civil war of 1997, the KLA grew in member numbers and number of weapons at their disposal. From 1998, attacks against Serbian security forces significantly increased and the KLA also attempted to "cleanse" Kosovo of its ethnic Serbian population.

References

Sources
 

 
Riots and civil disorder in Serbia
Kosovo Albanians
Albanian nationalism in Kosovo
Albanian separatism
1995 in Serbia
1996 in Serbia
1997 in Serbia
1998 in Serbia
1990s in Kosovo
Kosovo War
History of Kosovo
Terrorism in Yugoslavia
Separatism in Serbia